Country Life books are publications, mostly on English country houses and gardens, compiled from the articles and photographic archives of Country Life magazine, usually published in the UK by Aurum Press and in the USA by Rizzoli.

Books (in reverse chronology)
From the Archives of Country Life:
Gertrude Jekyll and the Country House Garden (2011) Judith B. Tankard, Aurum Press, 192 pages, . Rizzoli USA, .
The Classical Country House (2010) David Watkin, Aurum Press, 192 pages, .
The Victorian Country House (2009) Michael Hall, Aurum Press, 192 pages, . USA: Lasting Elegance: English Country Houses 1830-1900, Monacelli Press, .
The English Country House (2009) Mary Miers, Rizzoli International Publications, 484 pages, .
Charles Latham's Gardens of Italy (2009) Helena Attlee, Aurum Press, 192 pages, .
The Country Houses of John Vanbrugh (2008) Jeremy Musson, Aurum Press, 192 pages, .
Country Houses of the Cotswolds (2008) Sir Nicholas Mander, Aurum Press, 192 pages, .
The Country Houses of Robert Adam (2007) Eileen Harris, Aurum Press, 192 pages, .
The Great Edwardian Gardens of Harold Peto (2007) Robin Whalley, Aurum Press, 192 pages, .
Villa Gardens of the Mediterranean (2006) Kathryn Bradley-Hole, Aurum Press, 208 pages, .
The Regency Country House (2005) John Martin Robinson, Aurum Press, 192 pages, .
English Gardens of the Twentieth Century (2005) Tim Richardson, Aurum Press, 224 pages, .
Twentieth Century Houses in Britain (2004) Alan Powers, Aurum Press, 192 pages, .
Lost Gardens of England (2004) Kathryn Bradley-Hole, Aurum Press, 192 pages, .

See also 
Country Life (magazine)
Country House

External links 
Country Life Picture Library - publications listing
 
British and Irish Historic House books recently published - Wikipedia

Architecture in England